The Sudeten Philharmonic is an orchestra based in Wałbrzych, in southwestern Poland. In 2012 it recorded  the two Violin Concertos by Maltese composer Karl Fiorini for a CD to be released by Metier Records (a Divine Art Recordings Group label) in early 2014. The recording was conducted by Bartosz Zurakowski.

External links
Official site

Wałbrzych
Polish orchestras
Symphony orchestras